The IAE Nice (Institut d'Administration des Entreprises de Nice) is a business school in the South of France, part of Nice University.

It delivers degrees in finance, audit, marketing, wealth management, public management and tourism management.

Faculty 

The school is composed of 33 permanent faculty members, and invites more than 110 external speakers each year to conduct lectures and courses within the various programs. It welcomes more than 1000 students every year.

MBA program 

IAE Nice is well known for its MBA programs in Finance and Marketing, one of the first of its kind in France.

References

External links
 Official Web Site
 Official MBA's Web Site

Nice
Universities and colleges in Nice